Raudna River is river in Estonia in Viljandi County. The river is 68.6 km long and basin size is 1122.5 km2. It runs from Viljandi Lake into Halliste River.

There live also trouts and Thymallus thymallus.

References

Rivers of Estonia
Viljandi County